Johan Granath (born 4 March 1950) is a Swedish speed skater. He competed at the 1972 Winter Olympics, the 1976 Winter Olympics and the 1980 Winter Olympics. In March 1976, he won the Sprint World Championship title. The same year, he also appeared on the television show Superstars.

References

External links
 
 

1950 births
Living people
Swedish male speed skaters
Olympic speed skaters of Sweden
Speed skaters at the 1972 Winter Olympics
Speed skaters at the 1976 Winter Olympics
Speed skaters at the 1980 Winter Olympics
People from Köping
World Sprint Speed Skating Championships medalists
Sportspeople from Västmanland County
20th-century Swedish people